Limited atonement (also called definite atonement or particular redemption) is a doctrine accepted in some Christian theological traditions. It is particularly associated with the Reformed tradition and is one of the five points of Calvinism. The doctrine states that though the death of Jesus Christ is sufficient to atone for the sins of the whole world, it was the intention of God the Father that the atonement of Christ's death would work itself out in only the elect, thereby leading them without fail to salvation. According to Limited Atonement, Christ died for the sins of the elect alone, and no atonement was provided for the reprobate. This is in contrast to a belief that God's prevenient grace (or "enabling grace") enables all to respond to the salvation offered by God in Jesus Christ  so that it is each person's decision and response to God's grace that determines whether Christ's atonement will be effective to that individual.  A modified form of the doctrine also exists in Molinism.

History

The second century document Martydom of Polycarp said that Christ "suffered for the world of the saved", which can be interpreted to support an idea like limited atonoment, however it is not certain to teach a form of particular redemption and the book can also be understood in other ways, which do not necessate the view of limited atonoment.

The elements of the doctrine to be known as limited atonement were held by Gottschalk of Orbais (c. 808 – c. 867), Thomas Bradwardine (c. 1290 – 1349), and Gregory of Rimini (c. 1300 – 1358), though there was less precision regarding the extent of the atonement before the Reformation period.

The Synod of Dort was convened in 1618 in order to decide a controversy between the followers of Jacobus Arminius (Arminians), and other Calvinists. One of the issues involved had to do with the reason for the limitation of the efficacy of Christ's satisfaction for sin (roughly, atonement). Both sides of the controversy agreed that this efficacy was limited to the elect. The disagreement had to do with the grounds for this limitation. For Arminius, the ground was the free choice of people to believe, foreknown by God, with God predestining people based on this foreseen faith. For the opponents of Arminius, whose views are represented in the Canons of Dort, this efficacy was limited based on God's predestination, without any foreknowledge of human choice. Calvin clearly taught this second view, and it is also the view of Reformed theologians following the Synod of Dort.

The doctrine of limited atonement also includes the claim that the purpose for which Jesus gave his life was limited to the elect - the atonement is limited in its purpose. For this reason, the so-called "four-point Calvinists", such as the 17th century English Puritan Richard Baxter, reject the doctrine of limited atonement and instead believe that the atonement is available to all who will believe in Christ. They also argue that it was never endorsed by Calvin or the Synod of Dort. They refer to both Calvin's claim that "It is also a fact, without controversy, that Christ came to atone for the sins 'of the whole world'" and to Article 3 of the Second Main Point of Doctrine of the Synod of Dort which states that "This death of God's Son is the only and entirely complete sacrifice and satisfaction for sins; it is of infinite value and worth, more than sufficient to atone for the sins of the whole world.". Others, however, claim that Calvin and the Canons of Dort are somewhat vague on this issue and accept the claim of limited atonement that the efficacy of his death was limited both in purpose and scope to the elect, though they believe his death was sufficient payment for the sin of the whole world. 

With regard to the limited purpose or intent of the atonement to save only the elect, another argument was put forth later in the 17th century. Moses Amyraut and several others (Amyraldists) proposed a system called hypothetical universalism, which taught that in God's decree for Christ to be a sufficient atonement for all sin, his intention was to save all on condition that they believe. This decree was prior to his decree to elect some people for whom the atonement was to be efficacious, and so the efficacy of the atonement was still limited to the elect. Most of the Reformed rejected this view because it envisioned a decree of God (the conditional decree to save all) that was intentionally not realized.

Theology 

The doctrine of the limited scope (or extent) of the atonement is intimately tied up with the doctrine of the nature of the atonement. It also has much to do with the general Calvinist view of predestination. Calvinists advocate the satisfaction theory of the atonement, which developed in the writings of Anselm of Canterbury and Thomas Aquinas. In brief, the Calvinistic refinement of this theory, known as penal substitution, states that the atonement of Christ pays the penalty incurred by the sins of men—that is, Christ receives the wrath of God for sins and thereby receives in himself the penalty of the sins of men.

The doctrine of limited atonement is often argued from the theological argument of double jeopardy. In the limited view, Jesus Christ has taken the penalty of the elect - that Jesus died for those who would believe, so that those for whom Christ died must be saved and cannot be damned as it would be unjust for God to punish the same sins twice (double jeopardy). If Jesus died for all, they argue, then all must be saved. The penal theory of the atonement is therefore the basis of the necessity for a limited atonement.

The Calvinist view of predestination teaches that God created Adam in a state of original righteousness, but he fell into sin and all humanity in him as their federal head. Those elected to salvation were chosen without a view to their faith or good works but by the sovereign will of God.

The Calvinist atonement is called definite by some because they believe it certainly secures the salvation of those for whom Christ died, and it is called limited in its extent because it effects salvation for the elect only. Calvinists do not believe the power of the atonement is limited in any way, which is to say that no sin is too great to be expiated by Christ's sacrifice, in their view. Among English Calvinistic (Particular) Baptists, the doctrine was usually known as particular redemption, giving its adherents the name Particular Baptists. This term emphasizes the intention of God to save particular persons through the atonement, as opposed to mankind in general as General Baptists believe.

Biblical passages 

A shepherd of those times would call his sheep from a mix of flocks, and his sheep would hear his voice and follow, while the sheep of other flocks would ignore any but their own shepherd's voice.. In that context, Jesus says, "I am the good shepherd. I know my own and my own know me, ...and I lay down my life for the sheep," and he tells the Pharisees that they "do not believe because [they] are not part of [his] flock." He continues, "My sheep hear my voice, and I know them, and they follow me. I give them eternal life, and they will never perish, and no one will snatch them out of my hand." Since Calvinists (and many other Christians) believe that not all have eternal life with God, Calvinists conclude that there are only two possibilities: either Jesus was wrong in saying that he would lose none of his sheep (a conclusion they reject), or Jesus must not have laid down his life for everyone, as they understand John 10 to imply. Formally, the Calvinist position can be expressed this way:

 Jesus lays down his life for the sheep.
 Jesus will lose none of his sheep.
 Many people will not receive eternal life.
Therefore, the Calvinist position is that Jesus did die for everyone, but his atoning death will only save those whom the Father purposed to save.

Additionally, in the high priestly prayer, Jesus prays for the protection and sanctification of those who believed in him, and he explicitly excludes praying for all: "I am not praying for the world but for those whom you have given me, for they are yours.". Paul instructs the elders in Ephesus "to shepherd the church of God which He purchased with His own blood,"[Acts 20:28] and he says in his letter to the same church that "Christ loved the church and gave himself up for her." Likewise, Jesus foreshadows that he will lay down his life "for his friends," and an angel tells Jesus' earthly father Joseph that he "will save His people from their sins". Calvinists believe that these passages demonstrate that Jesus died for the church (that is, the elect) only.

Opponents to Calvinism often cite passages such as those below they believe clearly contradict limited atonement:

 Jesus promises that whosoever believes in him has everlasting life. John 3:16
 Peter proclaims that everyone who calls upon Jesus will be saved. 
 God calls all people everywhere to repent. , 
 God desires all people to be saved.  
 Jesus is a ransom for all. 
 Jesus is the propitiation "for our sins, and not for ours only but also for the sins of the whole world."

Confessional positions 

Chapter 3, paragraph 6 of the Westminster Confession of Faith says, "Neither are any other redeemed by Christ, effectually called, justified, adopted, sanctified, and saved, but the elect only."

The Canons of Dort assert that "This death of God's Son is the only and entirely complete sacrifice and satisfaction for sins; it is of infinite value and worth, more than sufficient to atone for the sins of the whole world" (Section 2, Article 3). Article 8 of the same section says
For it was the entirely free plan and very gracious will and intention of God the Father that the enlivening and saving effectiveness of his Son's costly death should work itself out in all his chosen ones, in order that he might grant justifying faith to them only and thereby lead them without fail to salvation. In other words, it was God's will that Christ through the blood of the cross (by which he confirmed the new covenant) should effectively redeem from every people, tribe, nation, and language all those and only those who were chosen from eternity to salvation and given to him by the Father; that he should grant them faith (which, like the Holy Spirit's other saving gifts, he acquired for them by his death); that he should cleanse them by his blood from all their sins, both original and actual, whether committed before or after their coming to faith; that he should faithfully preserve them to the very end; and that he should finally present them to himself, a glorious people, without spot or wrinkle.

Objections to the doctrine 

Limited atonement is contrasted with the view popularly termed unlimited atonement, which is advocated by Arminian, Methodist, Lutheran, Messianic Jewish, and Roman Catholic theologians (among others) and which says Christ's work makes redemption possible for all but certain for none. (This doctrine should not be confused with concepts of universal reconciliation, in which God saves his entire creation). Though Lutherans and Catholics share a similar doctrine of the nature of the atonement with Calvinists, they differ on its extent, whereas Arminians and Methodists generally accept an alternate theory of the nature of the atonement such as the Governmental theory of atonement. The elect in such models are all the people who choose to avail themselves of God's gracious offer of salvation through Christ, not a pre-determined group. Thus, these systems place a limit on the efficacy of the atonement rather than on its extent, like Calvinists.

Some have contended that the doctrine of particular redemption implies that Christ's sacrifice was insufficient to atone for the sins of the whole world, but Calvinists have universally rejected this notion, instead holding that the value of the atonement is infinite but that God intentionally withholds its efficacious availability only to the elect.

Comparison among Protestants 

This table summarizes three different Protestant beliefs.

In the Lutheran confessions, the Formula of Concord on the article on the doctrine of election states:

The eternal election of God, however, vel praedestinatio (or predestination), that is, God's ordination to salvation, does not extend at once over the godly and the wicked, but only over the children of God, who were elected and ordained to eternal life before the foundation of the world was laid, as Paul says, Eph. 1:4. 5: He hath chosen us in Him, having predestinated us unto the adoption of children by Jesus Christ.

The Canons of Dort, one of the earliest Calvinist confessions, state in the Second Head, Article 8:

[...]it was the will of God that Christ by the blood of the cross, whereby He confirmed the new covenant, should effectually redeem out of every people, tribe, nation, and language, all those, and those only, who were from eternity chosen to salvation and given to Him by the Father;[...]

In contrast, James Arminius states in his works the following:

[...]To these succeeds the fourth decree, by which God decreed to save and damn certain particular persons. This decree has its foundation in the foreknowledge of God, by which he knew from all eternity those individuals who would, through his preventing (prevenient) grace, believe, and, through his subsequent grace would persevere, according to the before described administration of those means which are suitable and proper for conversion and faith; and, by which foreknowledge, he likewise knew those who would not believe and persevere.[...]

References

External links 

 Pro
 The Death of Death in the Death of Christ by John Owen with a famous introduction by J. I. Packer, who says, "It is safe to say that no comparable exposition of the work of redemption as planned and executed by the Triune Jehovah has ever been done since Owen published his. None has been needed....[N]obody has a right to dismiss the doctrine of the limitedness, or particularity, of atonement as a monstrosity of Calvinistic logic until he has refuted Owen's proof that it is part of the uniform biblical presentation of redemption, clearly taught in plain text after plain text. And nobody has done that yet." It should be noted of course that those who oppose the doctrine would disagree that Owen has "proved" anything from "plain text after plain text," maintaining that instead he has misinterpreted his texts; they would also disagree with the assertion that "no one has done that [refuting] yet."
 "For Whom Did Christ Die?", part 3, chapter 8 of Charles Hodge's Systematic Theology
 "Particular Redemption", a sermon by Charles Spurgeon delivered on 1858-02-28
 "Limited Atonement", chapter 12 from The Reformed Doctrine of Predestination by Loraine Boettner
 Articles on Definite Atonement at Monergism.com
 "Limited Atonement", a series of articles by Ra McLaughlin

 Con
 Introduction to The Death Christ Died: A Case for Unlimited Atonement by Robert Lightner
 Calvin's Error of Limited Atonement by D.A. Waite
 "Father, Whose Everlasting Love" by Charles Wesley
 Sermon #128: "Free Grace" by John Wesley
 'God's Strategy in Human History,' Roger Forster, Paul Marston, Wipf & Stock Publishers (July 2001). This contains both a theological discussion as well as an historical overview of the doctrine of Calvinism in the church, claiming that it originated with St. Augustine. Numerous earlier Church Fathers are quoted to support this.

Atonement in Christianity
Calvinist theology
Christian terminology
Five Points of Calvinism